Jamaal T. Bailey (born August 26, 1982) is an American attorney and politician serving as a member of the New York State Senate from the 36th district. A Democrat, he represents portions of Baychester, Co-op City, Eastchester, Edenwald, Wakefield, Pelham Gardens, and Woodlawn Heights in the Bronx as well as Mount Vernon in Westchester County.

Early life and education
Bailey was born and raised in the Bronx, where he attended New York City Public Schools, including P.S. 83 in Morris Park and M.S 181 in Co-op City. He later attended the Bronx High School of Science. He earned a Bachelor of Arts degree from the University at Albany, SUNY and a Juris Doctor from the CUNY School of Law.

Career 
A protege of New York State Assembly Speaker Carl Heastie, Bailey began his political career as an intern in Heastie's office.

New York State Senate
In mid 2016, state Senator Ruth Hassell-Thompson resigned from her seat to take a position with New York Governor Andrew Cuomo, and Bailey ran in the state primary to replace her. Against four other Democratic candidates, Bailey would win an outright majority of the vote with over 55%. Much of his success was attributed to both his roots in the district, as well as the strong support given by Assembly Speaker Carl Heastie, who Bailey formerly worked for. Heastie's district covers a portion of the same area of the Bronx.

Bailey won a second term unopposed in 2018. With Democrats taking the majority in the Senate, Bailey became chair of the Senate Committee on Codes.

Personal life 
Bailey is married with two daughters.

References

External links
Senator Jamaal Bailey official site

|-

1982 births
21st-century American politicians
Living people
Democratic Party New York (state) state senators
Politicians from the Bronx
The Bronx High School of Science alumni